Neocalanus cristatus is a species of copepod found primarily in the northern Pacific.

Description

Distribution
Neocalanus cristatus is found in the northern Pacific and, in lesser numbers, in the Chukchi Sea and the Arctic Sea. It has also been recorded off of the coast of Chile.

Ecology

Life cycle and reproduction
Although N. cristatus breeds year round, it peaks in terms of reproductive activity from October to December. Breeding occurs at depth; at Station P, adults reproduce at depths below . At Site H, off of the east coast of Hokkaido, adults reproduce at depths below . After being spawned, the nauplii ascend to the surface. During this ascent, they develop into stage VI nauplii or stage I copepodites. The nauplii feed off of their large yolk during their growth. Stage I through IV copepodites are found in the top  of depth. It takes about four months to develop from a stage I to a stage V copepodite. Stage V copepodites migrate below  of depth in July and August and enter diapause, emerging as adults after September. Overall, the life cycle of N. cristatus is annual, like the rest of its genus.

References

Calanoida
Crustaceans of the Pacific Ocean
Fauna of the Arctic Ocean
Taxa named by Henrik Nikolai Krøyer
Crustaceans described in 1848